Ross O'Hanley (February 2, 1939April 7, 1972) was an American football safety with the Boston Patriots of the American Football League from 1960 to 1965.  He was an All-League AFL player in 1960.

O'Hanley was selected by the Miami Dolphins in the 1966 AFL expansion draft but never played a game for them.  He suffered a severe thigh bruise during the preseason and missed the 1966 season, and was cut and retired before the 1967 season.

After football, O'Hanley worked as a high school math teacher and as aide in the Massachusetts attorney general's office, before being struck by a brain tumor in 1971.

See also
List of American Football League players

References

1939 births
1972 deaths
Politicians from Everett, Massachusetts
Sportspeople from Everett, Massachusetts
Players of American football from Massachusetts
American football safeties
Boston College Eagles football players
Boston Patriots players
American Football League All-League players
Miami Dolphins players
Deaths from brain cancer in the United States